Rigabad (also Romanized as Rīgābād; also known as Rīgābād-e Chahār Rīgān) is a village in Chahdegal Rural District, Negin Kavir District, Fahraj County, Kerman Province, Iran. At the 2006 census, its population was 34, in 7 families.

References 

Populated places in Fahraj County